Serge Chiesa (born 25 December 1950 in Casablanca) is a former professional footballer.

He is a historic player of Olympique Lyonnais, an excellent dribbler whose skill was comparable to Michel Platini. In 1975–76, he was voted 'best attacking midfielder' of the season by France Football.

Honours
Olympique Lyonnais
Coupe de France: 1972–73
Trophée des Champions: 1973

External links

1950 births
Living people
French footballers
Moroccan emigrants to France
France international footballers
Olympique Lyonnais players
US Orléans players
Clermont Foot players
Ligue 1 players
Ligue 2 players
Association football forwards